Zographus plicaticollis is a species of beetle in the family Cerambycidae. It was described by James Thomson in 1868. It is known from South Africa and Namibia.

References

Sternotomini
Beetles described in 1868